Six Invitational (SI) is an annual world championship tournament for the five-on-five esports video game Rainbow Six Siege. Produced by the game's developer Ubisoft, Six Invitational is the final event of the competitive Siege season and consists of 20 teams: 16 based on final results from the Season Global Standings; and four from Europe, North America, Latin America, and Asia Pacific regional qualifiers. SI was first held in Montreal, home of the Ubisoft studio working on the game, until it began to be hosted internationally starting with Six Invitational 2021.

The most recent champion is G2 Esports, who won Six Invitational 2023, thus becoming the first team to win Six Invitational more than once.

Format 
The Six Invitational 2020 announced enormous changes to both the game itself and the competitive scene. The changes included the end of Pro League and a new points-based system. These changes to the competitive scene have been compared to that of Dota 2 and League of Legends.

Tournaments

Regions which have reached the final

References

External links
 

Ubisoft
Recurring sporting events established in 2017
Esports tournaments